David G. Davies is a microbiologist and associate professor at Binghamton University in Binghamton, New York (United States).  His interests lie specifically in the study of biofilms.  He has a Ph.D. in Microbiology from Montana State University (1996).

External links
Dr. David Davies at Binghamton University

Binghamton University faculty
State University of New York faculty
Living people
Year of birth missing (living people)
Place of birth missing (living people)
Montana State University alumni